The following is a discography of production credited to Mobb Deep member and producer Havoc.

Singles produced

1993

Mobb Deep – Juvenile Hell 
 01. "Intro"
 05. "Skit #1"
 06. "Hold Down the Fort" 
 09. "Skit #2"  
 11. "Skit #3"

1994

Mobb Deep – Shook Ones 12" 
 A1. "Shook Ones"

1995

Mobb Deep – The Infamous 
(All tracks credited to Mobb Deep, except where noted)
 01. "The Start of Your Ending (41st Side)" 
 03. "Survival of the Fittest"
 04. "Eye For a Eye (Your Beef Is Mines)" (featuring Nas and Raekwon)
 07. "Temperature's Rising" (featuring Crystal Johnson) (Produced by The Abstract, co-produced by Mobb Deep)
 08. "Up North Trip" 
 09. "Trife Life" 
 10. "Q.U.- Hectic"
 11. "Right Back At You" (featuring Ghostface Killah, Raekwon and Big Noyd) (Produced with Schott Free)
 13. "Cradle to the Grave"
 14. "Drink Away the Pain (Situations)" (featuring Q-Tip) (Produced by The Abstract, co-produced by Mobb Deep)
 15. "Shook Ones Pt. II"
 16. "Party Over" (featuring Big Noyd) (Produced with Matt Life)

Mobb Deep – Survival of the Fittest 12" 
 A2. "Survival of the Fittest (Remix)" (featuring Crystal Johnson)

1996

Nas – It Was Written 
 09. "The Set Up" (featuring Havoc)
 13. "Live Nigga Rap" (featuring Mobb Deep)

Mobb Deep – Hell on Earth 
 01. "Animal Instinct" (featuring Twin Gambino & Ty Nitty)
 02. "Drop a Gem on 'Em"  
 03. "Bloodsport"
 04. "Extortion" (featuring Method Man)
 05. "More Trife Life" 
 06. "Man Down" (featuring Big Noyd)
 07. "Can't Get Enough Of It" (featuring Illa Ghee)
 08. "Nighttime Vultures" (featuring Raekwon)
 09. "G.O.D. Pt. III" 
 10. "Get Dealt With" 
 11. "Front Lines (Hell on Earth)"
 12. "Give It Up Fast" (featuring Big Noyd & Nas)
 13. "Still Shinin'"
 14. "Apostle's Warning" 
 15. "In The Long Run" (featuring Ty Nitty & Money No)

Big Noyd – Episodes of a Hustla 
 03. "Recognize & Realize (Part 1)"
 04. "All Pro"
 05. "Infamous Mobb"
 07. "Usual Suspect"
 08. "Episodes Of A Hustla"
 09. "Recognize & Realize (Part 2)"
 10. "I Don't Wanna Love Again"

Foxy Brown – Ill Na Na 
 05. "The Promise" (featuring Havoc)

Various artists – Sunset Park (soundtrack) 
 04. "Back at You"

The Almighty RSO – Doomsday: Forever RSO 
 03. "The War's On" (feat. Prodigy)

Various artists – NFL Jams 
 11. "No Doubt" – performed by Havoc and Tyrone Wheatley

Shaquille O'Neal – You Can't Stop the Reign 
 08. "Legal Money" (feat. Mobb Deep)

1997

The Notorious B.I.G. – Life After Death 
 06. "Last Day" (featuring The LOX) (Produced with Stevie J and Puff Daddy)

Cormega – The Realness 
 03. "Thun & Kicko" (featuring Prodigy)
 15. "Killaz Theme II" (featuring Mobb Deep)

Mic Geronimo – Vendetta 
 03. "Survival"

Various artists – Steel (soundtrack) 
 01. "Mobb of Steel"

Various artists – Soul in the Hole (soundtrack) 
 08. "Rare Species (Modus Operandi)"

Various artists – Hoodlum (soundtrack) 
 01. "Hoodlum"

Capone-N-Noreaga – The War Report 
 17. “Illegal Life” (feat. Tragedy Khadafi & Havoc)

1998

Method Man – Tical 2000: Judgement Day 
 19. "Play IV Keeps" (featuring Inspectah Deck, Mobb Deep, Streetlife and Hell Razah)

La the Darkman – Heist of the Century 
 03. "City Lights"
 12. "Figaro Chain" (feat. Havoc)

Various artists – Slam: The Soundtrack 
 12. "Feel My Gat Blow" – performed by Mobb Deep

1999

Mobb Deep – Murda Muzik 
 02. "Streets Raised Me" (featuring Big Noyd and Chinky)
 03. "What's Ya Poison" (featuring Cormega)
 04. "Spread Love"
 05. "Let a Ho Be a Ho"
 06. "I'm Going Out" (featuring Lil' Cease)
 07. "Allustrious"
 08. "Adrenaline"
 10. "Quiet Storm"
 11. "Where Ya Heart At" 
 13. "Can't Fuck Wit" (featuring Raekwon)
 15. "Murda Muzik" 
 18. "It's Mine" (featuring Nas)
 19. "Quiet Storm (Remix)" (featuring Lil' Kim)

Various artists – Violator: The Album 
 10. "Nobody Likes Me" – performed by Mobb Deep
 13. "Shit That He Said" – performed by Big Noyd

Nas – Nastradamus 
 07. "Shoot 'Em Up"

Originoo Gunn Clappaz – The M-Pire Shrikez Back 
 14. "Suspect Niggaz" (feat. Buckshot and Havoc)

Charli Baltimore – Cold as Ice 
 13. "Infamous" (feat. Mobb Deep & Mike Delorian)

Coko – Triflin''' 12" ===
 A2. "Triflin' (Mobb Deep Remix)" (feat. Havoc)

== 2000 ==

=== LL Cool J – G.O.A.T. ===
 15. "Queens Is" (featuring Prodigy)

=== Prodigy – H.N.I.C. ===
 09. "Wanna Be Thugs" (featuring Havoc)
 11. "Delt with the Bullshit" (featuring Havoc)

=== Capone-N-Noreaga – The Reunion ===
 14. "Gunz in tha Air"
 17. "Queens’ Finest" (feat. Mobb Deep & Final Chapter)

=== Various artists – Nas & Ill Will Records Presents QB's Finest ===
 03. "We Live This" – performed by Big Noyd, Havoc, Roxanne Shanté
 10. "Power Rap" (Freestyle Interlude) – performed by Prodigy

=== Various artists – Any Given Sunday (soundtrack) ===
 03. "Never Goin' Back" – performed by Mobb Deep

== 2001 ==

=== Faith Evans – Faithfully ===
 15. "Heaven Only Knows" (Co-produced by Winans and Diddy)

=== Various artists – Hardball (soundtrack) ===
 10. "Play" – performed by Mobb Deep

=== Mobb Deep – Infamy ===
 01. "Pray for Me" (featuring Lil' Mo)
 03. "Bounce" 
 04. "Clap"
 05. "Kill That Nigga"  
 06. "My Gats Spitting" (featuring Infamous Mobb)
 07. "Handcuffs" 
 08. "Hey Luv (Anything)" (featuring 112)
 09. "The Learning (Burn)" (featuring Noyd and Vita)
 11. "Hurt Niggas" (featuring Noyd)
 14. "Crawlin'"
 15. "Nothing Like Home" (featuring Littles)

=== Various artists – Violator: The Album, V2.0 ===
 11. "U Feel Me/Options" – performed by Havoc, Fat Joe, Remy Ma and Capone

=== Various artists – Lake Entertainment Presents: The 41st Side ===
 02. "Cardboard Box" – performed by Havoc, Nature, Littles, The Jackal

== 2002 ==

=== Onyx – Bacdafucup Part II ===
 04. "Hold Up"

=== Infamous Mobb – Special Edition ===
 11. "We Don't Give A..."
 16. "War / Get High Get Bent"

== 2003 ==

=== Lil' Kim – La Bella Mafia ===
 02. "Hold It Now" (featuring Havoc)

=== Big Noyd – Only the Strong ===
 02. "Watch Out"
 05. "We Gangsta"
 07. "All 4 The Luv Of The Dough" (feat. Prodigy)
 08. "Invincible"

=== The Alchemist – The Cutting Room Floor (1st Infantry Mixtape 1) ===
 04. "Walk With Me"
 08. "First to Drop a Beat the Boldest"

=== Mobb Deep –  Double Shots / Favorite Rapper 12" ===
 B2. "Favorite Rapper"

=== Mobb Deep – Solidified / It's Over 12" ===
 A2. "Solidified"
 B2. "It's Over"

=== Mobb Deep – Gun Sling 12" ===
 A2. "Gun Sling"

=== Mobb Deep – Gangstaz Roll 12" ===
 A1. "Gangstaz Roll"
 B1. "Clap Those Thangs" (feat. 50 Cent)

== 2004 ==

=== Jadakiss – Kiss of Death ===
 06. "Why?" (featuring Anthony Hamilton)

=== Lloyd Banks – The Hunger for More ===
 01. "Ain't No Click" (featuring Tony Yayo)

=== Mobb Deep – Amerikaz Nightmare ===
 01. "Amerikaz Nightmare"
 03. "Flood the Block" 
 04. "Dump" (featuring Nate Dogg)
 08. "Shorty Wop" 
 10. "One of Ours Part II" (featuring Jadakiss)
 11. "On the Run"
 13. "Get Me" (featuring Littles and Noyd)
 14. "We Up"
 15. "Neva Change"

=== DJ Kay Slay – The Streetsweeper, Vol. 1 ===
 05. "Get Shot the Fuck Up"  (feat. Mobb Deep and Big Noyd)

=== Big Noyd – On The Grind ===
 03. "Most Famous"
 09. "Kill Dat There"
 11. "Off The Wall"
 12. "Ain't Too Much"
 15. "Infinite Team"
 16. "Money Rolls"

=== Hit Squad – Zero Tolerance ===
 17. "It's The Pee Back 2 Work" (Remix) – performed by PMD, Mobb Deep and Fat Joe

== 2005 ==

=== The Game – The Documentary ===
 07. "Don't Need Your Love" (featuring Faith Evans) (produced with Dr. Dre)

=== Various artists – Get Rich or Die Tryin' (soundtrack) ===
 12. "Born Alone, Die Alone" (performed by Lloyd Banks)

=== The Notorious B.I.G. – Duets: The Final Chapter ===
 12. "Beef" (featuring Mobb Deep)

=== Tragedy Khadafi – Thug Matrix ===
 02. "The Game" (feat. Havoc)

=== Tony Yayo – Thoughts of a Predicate Felon ===
 16. "Dear Suzie"

=== Sheek Louch – After Taxes ===
 05. "45 Minutes to Broadway"

=== Cormega – The Testament ===
 12. "Killaz Theme" (feat. Mobb Deep)

=== Rohff – Au-Delà De Mes Limites ===
 05. "Avec Ou Sans"

=== Makeba Mooncycle – Balance ===
 01. "Big East Main Event Freestyle"

=== DJ Mello & The Alchemist – Chemical Files ===
 12. "D Block To QB"

=== Big Twins – The Grimey One Vol. 1 ===
 07. "Get It Right" (featuring Mobb Deep)

== 2006 ==

=== Diddy – Press Play ===
 04. "The Future" 
 05. "Hold Up" (featuring Angela Hunte) (Co-produced by SC)

=== Lloyd Banks – Rotten Apple ===
 01. "Rotten Apple" (featuring 50 Cent & Prodigy) (Co-produced by Sha Money XL)

=== Mobb Deep – Blood Money ===
 01. "Smoke It" 
 02. "Put Em in Their Place" (Co-produced by Ky Miller and Sha Money XL) 
 03. "Stole Something" (featuring Lloyd Banks)
 04. "Creep" (featuring 50 Cent)
 05. "Speakin So Freely"
 08. "Click Click" (featuring Tony Yayo)
 14. "It's Alright" (featuring Mary J. Blige and 50 Cent)

=== Mobb Deep – Life of the Infamous: The Best of Mobb Deep ===
 16. "Blood Money" (previously unreleased)
 17. "Go Head" (previously unreleased)

=== Big Noyd – The Stick Up Kid ===
 01. "Infamous Team"
 04. "Money Roll"

=== Method Man – 4:21... The Day After ===
 04. "Somebody Done Fucked Up"

=== Styles P – Time Is Money ===
 03. "How We Live" (featuring Jadakiss)

=== Tragedy Khadafi – Thug Matrix 2 ===
 01. "What's Poppin'"

=== Bars N Hooks – The Most Notorious ===
 04. "World Premiere" (featuring Mobb Deep)

== 2007 ==

=== 50 Cent – Curtis ===
 12. "Fully Loaded Clip"  
 16. "Curtis 187"

=== Tragedy Khadafi – The Death of Tragedy ===
 01. "G-Formation"

=== Infamous Mobb – Reality Rap ===
 06. "Blauu!"

=== Mobb Deep – The Infamous Archives ===
Disc two
 01. "Cobra"

=== Havoc – The Kush ===
 01. "NY 4 Life"
 02. "I'm the Boss"
 03. "By My Side" (feat. 40 Glocc)
 04. "One Less Nigga"
 05. "Ride Out" (feat. Nyce da Future)
 06. "Balling Out" ( feat. Un Pacino)
 07. "What's Poppin' Tonite"
 08. "Class By Myself" (feat. Nitti)
 09. "Set Me Free" (feat. Prodigy & Nyce da Future)
 10. "Be There"
 11. "Hit Me Up" (feat. Un Pacino)
 12. "Get Off My Dick"

=== Killa Sha – God Walk On Water ===
 08. "Work The Plan" (feat. Havoc)

=== Illa Ghee – Bullet & a Bracelet ===
 14. "Pick His Face Up"

=== Los Angeles Finest – Los Angeles Finest E.P. ===
 B3. "The West"

== 2008 ==

=== Prodigy – H.N.I.C. Pt. 2 ===
 09. "Field Marshal P" (featuring Un Pacino)
 13. "I Want Out" (featuring Havoc & Un Pacino)
 16. "Get Trapped" (featuring Nyce & Un Pacino) [Bonus track]

=== Termanology – Politics as Usual ===
 13. "The Chosen (Resurrecting The Game)"

=== Big Twins – The Grimey Collection ===
 13. "Sold My Soul" (feat. Prodigy)

== 2009 ==

=== 50 Cent – Before I Self Destruct ===
 11. "Gangsta's Delight"

=== Method Man & Redman – Blackout! 2 ===
 02. "I'm Dope Nigga"

=== KRS-One & Buckshot – Survival Skills ===
 02. "Robot"

=== Havoc – Hidden Files ===
 01. "Can't Get Touched"
 02. "I Clap 'Em Up" 
 03. "Watch Me" (featuring Ricky Blaze)
 04. "Heart of the Grind" 
 05. "You Treated Me" (featuring Cassidy)
 06. "My Life"  
 07. "That's My Word" 
 08. "The Hustler"
 09. "The Millennium"
 10. "Walk Wit Me"
 11. "On a Mission" (featuring Prodigy)
 12. "This Is Where It's At" (featuring Big Noyd)
 13. "Don't Knock It 'Til You Try It"
 14. "Tell Me More" (featuring Sonyae Elise)

=== Capone-N-Noreaga – Channel 10 ===
 09. "Wobble" (featuring Mobb Deep)

=== R.A. the Rugged Man – Legendary Classics Volume 1 ===
 06. "Who's Dat Guy" (featuring Havoc)

=== Mobb Deep – The Safe Is Cracked ===
 01. "Mobb Deep"
 02. "Heat"
 03. "Watch Ya Self"
 04. "M.O.B."
 05. "Can't Win 4 Losin'"
 06. "Yea, Yea, Yea"
 07. "That Crack"
 08. "Infamous"
 10. "Position"
 11. "Get Out Our Way"
 12. "You Wanna See Me Fall"
 13. "Don't Play"
 14. "Mobb Deep II"

=== Cormega – Born And Raised ===
 03. "Love Your Family" (feat. Havoc)

=== Big Twins – The Project Kid ===
 10. "The Project Kid"
 16. "Number One" (feat. Prodigy)

=== Buckshot – Smirnoff Signature Mix Series 12"===
A2. "I Got Cha Opin '09" (feat. Kardinal Offishall)

== 2010 ==

=== Eminem – Recovery ===
 17. "Untitled" (produced with Magnedo7)

=== Hell Razah – Heaven Razah ===
 15. "Armageddon"

== 2011 ==

=== Bad Meets Evil – Hell: The Sequel ===
 01. "Welcome 2 Hell" (produced with Magnedo7)

=== Raekwon – Shaolin vs. Wu-Tang ===
 19. "Your World & My World" (featuring Havoc) iTunes bonus track

=== Travis Barker – Let the Drummer Get Wicked ===
 04. "Detroit" (Royce da 5'9") (produced with Travis Barker)

=== Mobb Deep – Black Cocaine ===
 03. "Conquer"

=== Termanology – Cameo King II ===
 12. "You Take Her" (feat. Freeway and Havoc)

== 2012 ==

=== 50 Cent – 5 (Murder by Numbers) ===
 07. "Money"
 08. "Definition of Sexy" (featuring Guordan)

=== Vinnie Paz – God of the Serengeti ===
 11. "Geometry of Business" (feat. La Coka Nostra)

=== 40 Glocc – New World Agenda ===
 20. "Bullet With Your Name On It"

== 2013 ==

=== Mack Wilds – New York: A Love Story ===
 03. "Henny" (produced with Salaam Remi)
 12. "Remember the Time" (produced with Salaam Remi)

=== Havoc – 13 ===
 01. "Gone"  
 02. "Favorite Rap Stars" (featuring Styles P & Raekwon)
 03. "Life We Chose" (featuring Lloyd Banks) (produced with FMG)
 04. "Colder Days" (featuring Masspike Miles) (produced with FMG)
 05. "Get Busy"  
 06. "Eyes Open" (featuring Twista)
 07. "Tell Me To My Face" (featuring Royce da 5'9") (produced with FMG)
 09. "Already Tomorrow"
 10. "Hear Dat"
 11. "Gettin' Mines" (produced with Andrew Lloyd and Team Green Productions)
 12. "Long Road" (Outro)

=== Alley Boy – War Cry ===
 18. "Gotta Get It"

=== DJ Duke – Winterz Hell ===
 19. "Tell Me To My Face" (feat. Royce Da 5'9")

== 2014 ==

=== G-Unit – The Beauty of Independence ===
 01. "Watch Me"

=== Havoc – 13 Reloaded ===
 01. "Best of the Best"
 02. "Not Yours"  
 03. "Uncut Raw" (performed by Mobb Deep)
 04. "Don't Take It Personal"
 05. "What I Rep" (featuring Sheek Louch) 
 06. "Dirty Calls"
 07. "What's Your Problem"
 08. "Listen to the Man" 
 09. "Fallen Soldiers" (featuring Cormega)
 10. "Get Your Shit"  
 11. "Outro (Top Seller)" (featuring Ferg Brim)
 12. "Tear Shit Up" (featuring Mysonne)
 13. "Champion Winner"
 14. "All I Know"

=== Mobb Deep – The Infamous Mobb Deep ===
 01. "Taking You Off Here"
 03. "Get Down"
 07. "Low"  (featuring Mack Wilds) (produced with Sevn Thomas and Boi-1da)
 10. "Gimme All That"
 11. "Legendary" (featuring Bun B and Juicy J) (produced with Boi-1da and The Maven Boys)

=== Papoose – Cigar Society ===
 02. "John F Kennedy" (featuring Cassidy)

== 2015 ==

=== Papoose – You Can't Stop Destiny ===
 03. "Mobbing" (featuring Troy Ave)

=== Bugsy da God – Camouflage Disciple ===
 10. "House of Horrors" (feat. Big Noyd and Dom Pachino)

=== Wax Wonder ===
 00. "Mind Your Own" (feat. KXNG Crooked)

== 2016 ==

=== Kanye West – The Life of Pablo ===
 04. "Famous" (feat. Rihanna) (produced with Kanye West, Noah Goldstein, Charlie Heat, Andrew Dawson, Hudson Mohawke, Mike Dean, and Plain Pat)
 12. "Real Friends" (featuring Ty Dolla Sign) (produced with Kanye West, Boi-1da, Frank Dukes, Darren King, Mike Dean, and Noah Goldstein)

== 2019 ==

=== Streetlife & Method Man – Squad Up 12'' ===
01. "Squad Up" (feat. Havoc)

=== Illa Ghee – The Whole Half of It ===
03. "Pull Up"

==2020==

===Conway the Machine – From King to a God ===
05. "Juvenile Hell" (feat. Flee Lord, Havoc & Lloyd Banks)

===Havoc and Flee Lord – In the Name of Prodigy===
01. "In the Name of P Intro"
02. "Torch Carriers" (feat. Ransom)
03. "Infamous Bop" (feat. Big Twins)
04. "Major Distribution" (feat. Busta Rhymes)
05. "All for the Goat" (feat. Conway the Machine)
06. "1 A.M. Music"
07. "Wu-Lords" (feat. Raekwon)
08. "Raise the Bar" (feat. Santana Fox)
09. "Mac in the Engine" (feat. Eto & Billy V)
10. "Bound to Take Losses" (feat. Havoc)

==2021==

===Havoc & Nyce da Future – Future of the Streets ===
01. "I Can't Believe It"
02. "Everything I Love"
03. "Boss of the Bosses" (feat. Havoc)
04. "Graphic"
05. "Savage"
06. "Say Yes"
07. "Active"
08. "Infamous"

===Havoc & Dark Lo – Extreme Measures===
01. "Mob Tales" (feat. Havoc)
02. "Lost Innocence"
03. "Zombie Land" (feat. Havoc)
04. "Extreme Measures" (feat. Styles P)
05. "Greatest Ever"
06. "Reports"
07. "Make It Home" (feat. Vado)
08. "Force of Life"
09. "Dirty Work"
10. "Captivating"
11. "Strong Minded"

===Havoc & Nyce da Future – Future of the Streets (Deluxe Edition)===
01. "I Can't Believe It"
02. "Everything I Love"
03. "Boss of the Bosses" (feat. Havoc)
04. "Graphic"
05. "Savage"
06. "Say Yes"
07. "Active"
08. "Infamous"
09. "Don P"
10. "Murda Rap"
11. "Keep the Same Energy" (feat. Havoc)
12. "By Any Means" (feat. Eto)
13. "Take It to the Top" (feat. Havoc)
14. "The Real Is Back" (feat. Robegod)

===Havoc & Styles P – Wreckage Manner===
01. "Fuck Around"
02. "Move How We Wanna"
03. "Fiend For"
04. "Pay Me in Cash"
05. "21 Gun Salute"
06. "YO 2 QB"
07. "Havoc and the Ghost"
08. "Good as Gold"
09. "Hymn to Him"
10. "Nightmares 2 Dreams"

==2022==

=== Marlon Craft - While We're Here ===
04. "Hans Zimmer" 

=== Daz Dillinger & Capone - Guidelinez ===
08. "We Ready" (feat. Havoc)
09. "Extendo" (feat. Conway the Machine)

=== Cormega - The Realness II'' 
09. "Essential"

References

External links
 
 
 

Production discographies
Hip hop discographies
Discographies of American artists